The Børøy Bridge is a bridge in Hadsel Municipality in Nordland county, Norway. The bridge carries Norwegian County Road 82 between the town of Stokmarknes on the island of Hadseløya to the nearby island of Børøya. Together with the Hadsel Bridge it connects the islands of Hadseløya and Langøya. The Børøy Bridge was built in 1967, and was the first of the main bridges in the Vesterålen islands. The municipality of Hadsel financed the building of the bridge after the municipality bought the island of Børøya in 1963.

See also
List of bridges in Norway
List of bridges in Norway by length
List of bridges
List of bridges by length

References

Road bridges in Nordland
Bridges completed in 1967
Hadsel
1967 establishments in Norway
Norwegian County Road 82